Special Delivery is a 1922 American comedy film directed by Roscoe Arbuckle. It was Arbuckle's first film as a director, albeit uncredited, following his acquittal of the manslaughter of Virginia Rappe. A print of the film survives in the film archive of the Museum of Modern Art.

Plot
As described in a film magazine, Al is told to deliver a radiophone message to a certain businessman. A gang of wicked looking plotters endeavor to capture him and steal the message. After a long chase involving Al's trick bicycle, the Sunshine lions of Fox studios, and scenes at the top of a tall building, Al safely delivers the message and the thugs are arrested.

Cast
 Al St. John
 Vernon Dent
 Billy Engle
 Tiny Ward

See also
 Fatty Arbuckle filmography

References

External links

1922 films
Films directed by Roscoe Arbuckle
1922 comedy films
1922 short films
American silent short films
American black-and-white films
Silent American comedy films
American comedy short films
1920s American films